The Northeast Regional is an intercity rail service operated by Amtrak in the Northeastern and Mid-Atlantic United States. In the past it has been known as the NortheastDirect, Acela Regional, or Regional. It is Amtrak's busiest route, carrying 8,686,930 passengers in fiscal year (FY) 2018, a 1.4% increase over the 8.57 million passengers in FY 2017. The Northeast Regional service earned over $613.9 million in gross ticket revenue in FY 2016, a 0.4% increase over the $611.7 million earned during FY 2015.

The Northeast Regional offers daily all-reserved service, usually at least every hour. Trains generally run along the Northeast Corridor between Boston, Massachusetts, and Washington, D.C., via New York City. Extensions and branches provide service to Newport News, Norfolk, and Roanoke, Virginia, and Springfield, Massachusetts, with intermediate stops.

Trains cover the most popular stretch between Pennsylvania Station (New York City) and Washington Union Station in approximately 3.5 hours. The section between New York and Philadelphia takes 1.5 hours, while the part between Philadelphia and Washington takes 2 hours. North of New York, the travel time to Boston is 4 hours, while trips to Springfield take 3.5 hours. South of Washington, trains take 4.5 hours to reach Newport News, 4.5 hours to reach Norfolk, or 5 hours to reach Roanoke.

History

The services along the line, as inherited from Penn Central, once had their own names, such as the "Yankee Clipper" and the "Federal"; typically a name applied to at most one train and its "twin" in the opposite direction. Electrification ended at New Haven, Connecticut, requiring an engine change. On October 28, 1995, Amtrak introduced the "NortheastDirect" brand for all trains on the Northeast Corridor (and its extension to Newport News, Virginia) except for the express  and hourly  services. The November 10, 1996, timetable restored the old names in addition to the NortheastDirect brand. The names (except the ) were dropped with the May 16, 1999, schedule. 

In 2000, Amtrak completed electrifying the route from New Haven to Boston in preparation for the introduction of the Acela Express, thereby eliminating the engine change at New Haven. The first two all-electric round-trips to and from Boston were branded Acela Regional and equipped with refurbished Amfleet cars painted in the Acela-like "Phase V" livery. All-electric service began on January 31, 2000. The NortheastDirect branding continued to be used for trains which changed from electric to diesel traction in New Haven.

Due to customer confusion with the Acela Express, the name was changed again on March 17, 2003, to simply "Regional." As part of rebranding and service improvements, the name was changed to "Northeast Regional" on June 23, 2008 (though it also appeared on schedules several months beforehand).

On May 12, 2015, Northeast Regional Train 188, traveling from Washington, D.C., to New York City, derailed in the Port Richmond neighborhood of Philadelphia, killing eight people and injuring more than 200 people. The train derailed along a curve and was determined to have been traveling at a speed of about 100 mph, exceeding the limit of 50 mph on that curve. This speed limit was not posted; engineers on that route are expected to rely on memory to control the speed of the train. Additionally, the train was suspected to have been hit by a projectile, as was a commuter train in the area shortly before the derailment.

Private sleeping rooms on overnight trains 65/66/67, last available in 2004 on the Federal, were made available effective April 5, 2021.

Virginia service

Some Northeast Regional trains continue into Virginia, serving three branches to Norfolk, Newport News, and Roanoke, serving points in between. These tracks are not electrified and are partially owned by both freight railroads and the State of Virginia.

After Amtrak took over intercity passenger service on May 1, 1971, rail service in Virginia was limited to a small number of long-distance trains, where they were often not suited to regional travel.

Virginia and Amtrak partnered in 2009 under the brand Amtrak Virginia to expand passenger rail service within the Commonwealth, making Virginia the 15th state to fund state services in addition to federally funded routes. One daily Northeast Regional round trip was extended to from Washington to Lynchburg via Manassas and Charlottesville on October 1, 2009, supplementing the existing Crescent service. In the first month, ridership doubled expectations. On July 20, 2010, Amtrak added an additional Northeast Regional frequency from Washington to Richmond Staples Mill Road station, increasing the Washington-Richmond corridor to eight daily round trips with hourly northbound morning service.

A further extension south from Richmond to Norfolk along Norfolk Southern tracks was planned by the Department of Rail & Public Transportation (DRPT), and the Commonwealth of Virginia in cooperation with Amtrak. Certain track upgrades (e.g., passing sidings, replacing track to increase operating speeds) between Richmond and Norfolk that were necessary to enable this extension were funded jointly by Norfolk Southern and DRPT. Service started on December 12, 2012. A second daily Norfolk round trip on weekdays was added on March 4, 2019. Schedules for the Newport News trains are also being modified to improve service to the Hampton Roads region.

On August 9, 2013, it was announced that Amtrak hoped to complete track and infrastructure upgrades in order to bring train service to Roanoke by 2016. The project encountered delays, and by late 2016 service was planned to begin in late 2017 with a single train extended from Lynchburg serving the city daily after construction of the Roanoke station platform, which was to begin in early 2017 and take most of the year. Amtrak began service to Roanoke on October 31, 2017.

On December 19, 2019, Virginia Governor Ralph Northam announced a $3.7 billion program to expand rail service in Virginia, which includes doubling the frequency of Amtrak service between Richmond and Washington. As part of the program, the commonwealth paid CSX Transportation $525 million to purchase 223 miles of track and 386 miles of right-of-way, a deal which was finalized on March 31, 2021. One round trip was extended from Staples Mill to Main Street in September 2021 as the first service expansion under the program. Service changes on July 11, 2022, added a second daily Roanoke round trip and an additional Norfolk weekday round trip (making three round trips on weekdays and two on weekends). That change resulted in July 2022 ridership on the state-supported Virginia routes being 20% higher than June 2022 and 29% higher than July 2019.

Extension of the route south of Roanoke to Christiansburg, Virginia, near Virginia Tech, is proposed, with further extension to Bristol, Virginia/Tennessee as a long-range possibility. Plans by the Virginia Department of Rail and Public Transportation (DRPT) depend on difficult negotiations with Norfolk Southern, and funding improvements for both freight and passenger service, as in previous agreements with private carriers. The town of Christiansburg acquired land for a new station in 2016. Meanwhile, the DRPT has started a statewide bus service, operated by Megabus, called the Virginia Breeze, for areas not served by rail. The three daily bus routes terminate at Washington Union Station, with stops at a few other Northeast Regional stations, and bypassing others for stops closer to highways. Closed in 1979, Bedford station in Bedford, Virginia, was not reopened as part of the extension to Roanoke. In 2021, the DRPT estimated that an infill station in Bedford would draw 10,050 new riders per year, cost $10.9 million, and could be completed by 2025.

Operation

Equipment

As of 2018, most Northeast Regional trains consist of 7 to 9 passenger cars hauled by a locomotive.

The passenger cars are the Amfleet I series passenger cars built by the Budd Company in the mid-to-late 1970s. Most trains include a Business Class car, a Café car (food service/lounge), and up to seven Coach Class cars, one of which is designated the quiet car, where passengers are asked to refrain from loud talking and mobile phone conversations.

The overnight Northeast Regional service (trains 65, 66, and 67) have a different configuration with fewer Coach Class cars, a combination Business Class/Café car, a baggage car for checked baggage service, and a Viewliner sleeping car which travels the full route to and from Newport News, VA but is only open to passengers between Boston and Washington.

In the coming years all equipment will be replaced with Amtrak Airo trainsets, the railroad's branding of its combination of Siemens Venture passenger cars and a Siemens Charger diesel-electric locomotive. The trainsets for the Northeast Corridor will have eight passenger cars, which will include a food service area and a mix of 2x2 Coach Class and 2x1 Business Class seating. The car closest to the locomotive will be a specialized "Auxiliary Power Vehicle" which will include a pantograph to collect power from overhead lines and will feed it to four traction motors in the car, and via a DC link cable, to the four traction motors in the locomotive. Outside of electrified territory, the locomotive's diesel engine will generate power for the traction motors. The arrangement will offer a near seamless transition between power sources on through trains to Virginia and Springfield, Massachusetts, a process that currently requires a time-consuming locomotive change.

Classes of service
All classes of service include complimentary WiFi, an electric outlet (120 V, 60 Hz AC) at each seat, reading lamps, fold-out tray tables. Reservations are required on all trains, tickets may be purchased online, from a station agent, a ticketing machine, or, at a higher cost, from the conductor on the train.
Coach Class: 2x2 seating. Passengers self-select seats on a first-come, first-served basis.
Business Class: 2x2 or 2x1 seating with more legroom than coach. Passengers receive a complimentary soft drink. Seats are assigned in advance.
Sleeper Service (overnight trains only): Viewliner Roomette, Bedroom or Accessible Bedroom. Passengers receive a complimentary alcoholic beverage upon boarding, a continental breakfast before arrival, and lounge access in Washington, D.C. and Boston.

Route

Most Northeast Regional trains operate over the Northeast Corridor between Boston and Washington (via New York, Philadelphia, and Baltimore). The corridor is owned, in part, by Amtrak, the Massachusetts Bay Transportation Authority (MBTA), Metro-North Railroad (MNRR), and the Connecticut Department of Transportation (CDOT).
MBTA Attleboro Line: Boston to MA/RI state line (dispatched and maintained by Amtrak)
Amtrak Northeast Corridor: MA/RI state line to New Haven, Connecticut
CDOT New Haven Line: New Haven to CT/NY state line (dispatched and maintained by MNRR)
MNRR New Haven Line: CT/NY state line to New Rochelle, New York
Amtrak Northeast Corridor: New Rochelle to Washington, D.C.

Some trips diverge at New Haven and turn north to serve Springfield, Massachusetts, operating over Amtrak's New Haven–Springfield Line. For trains that don't, Amtrak's  trains provide connecting service along the line, with timed transfers to and from many Northeast Regional trips.

Several trips continue south of Washington D.C. to Virginia, running to either Roanoke, Richmond, Newport News, or Norfolk. All Virginia services use the northernmost portion of the ex-Richmond, Fredericksburg and Potomac Railroad (now owned by CSX Transportation) between Washington and Alexandria, Virginia. South of Alexandria, trains to Roanoke use the Norfolk Southern Railway (ex-Southern Railway, ex-Virginia Midland Railway). Trains to Richmond, Norfolk and Newport News use the CSX RF&P, Richmond Terminal, and Bellwood subdivisions between Alexandria and Richmond.

South of Richmond, trains to Newport News use the CSX Peninsula Subdivision. Trains to Norfolk use the CSX North End Subdivision and Norfolk Southern's Norfolk District (ex-Norfolk and Western Railway).

Funding
Amtrak receives federal funding for its operations between Boston and Washington, D.C. Northeast Regional operations south of Washington are funded in part by the Commonwealth of Virginia. Operations along the New Haven–Springfield Line are funded by the State of Connecticut and the Commonwealth of Massachusetts.

Station stops

Boston–Washington, D.C.

Springfield–New Haven

Washington, D.C.–Newport News / Norfolk

Washington, D.C.–Roanoke

References

Notes

External links

Amtrak routes
Passenger rail transportation in Massachusetts
Passenger rail transportation in Rhode Island
Passenger rail transportation in Connecticut
Passenger rail transportation in New York (state)
Passenger rail transportation in New Jersey
Passenger rail transportation in Pennsylvania
Passenger rail transportation in Delaware
Passenger rail transportation in Maryland
Passenger rail transportation in Washington, D.C.
Passenger rail transportation in Virginia
Commuter rail in the United States
Higher-speed rail
Northeast Corridor